The 2017 CWL Global Pro League was a Call of Duty: Infinite Warfare tournament on PlayStation 4 that occurred on April 21-July 30, 2017.

Format
The 2017 CWL Global Pro League consisted of 2 Stages, with 16 teams from North America, Europe and the APAC region participating. The 16 teams were split into 4 different pools with the top 2 teams from each pool advancing to playoffs. The top 3 teams from each pool advanced to Stage 2, while the fourth place team had to go to the relegation playoffs.

Stage 1
A total of $700,000 prize money was given out during Stage 1. All 16 teams received $12,500 for participating while the 8 teams which qualified for playoffs played for another $500,000.

Group Red

Group Blue

Group Yellow

Group Green

Stage 1 Playoffs final standings

Relegation
The 4 bottom teams from Stage 1 participated in the relegation tournament against 4 other teams in a double-elimination bracket for the final 4 spots in Stage 2.

Stage 2
A total of $700,000 prize money was given out during Stage 2. All 16 teams received $12,500 for participating while the 8 teams which qualified for playoffs played for another $500,000. The top 3 teams from all Stage 1 groups and the 4 teams which qualified via the relegation tournament participated in Stage 2. All 16 teams also qualified for the 2017 Call of Duty Championship.

Group Red

Group Red

Group Yellow

Group Green

Stage 2 Playoffs final standings

References

2017 in Los Angeles
2017 in sports in California
2017 first-person shooter tournaments
Call of Duty competitions
Major League Gaming competitions